Basil Church (October 1849 – 31 January 1881) was a New Zealand cricketer. He played one first-class match for Otago in 1871/72.

Church was born in Northamptonshire in England. He worked as a schoolteacher.

See also
 List of Otago representative cricketers

References

External links
 

1849 births
1881 deaths
New Zealand cricketers
Otago cricketers
Sportspeople from Kettering